The Loening S-1 Flying Yacht, also called the Loening Model 23, was an early light monoplane flying boat designed in the United States by Grover Loening in the early 1920s. The aircraft won the 1921 Collier Trophy.

Design and development
The S-1 Flying Yacht was a high-wing, strut-braced monoplane with the engine mounted pusher-fashion in a nacelle atop the wing. The cabin was semi-enclosed, featuring side windows but no roof, and was located immediately ahead of the wing. 

Twin tails were fitted, carrying a common stabiliser in a high position. The construction was unusual, in that rather than the flying boat hull being integral with the fuselage, the Model 23's hull was a large, separate pontoon mounted directly underneath a fuselage that was a separate structure. This was intended to combine the safety of a floatplane design with the low parasitic drag of a conventional flying boat Grover Loening was awarded the 1921 Aero Club of America Trophy for the design. 

The fuel tank was located under the rear passenger seat. The prototype was tested with a new roll-control mechanism to replace ailerons using a small leading edge that extended and retracted outboard of the wing tips.

Operational history
The S-1 was the second seaplane in monoplane configuration ever to go into production. It was one of the fastest seaplanes in production in 1921.

Three of the Air Yachts were purchased by the New York-Newport Air Service, and nine by the United States Army Air Service which operated them under the designation S-1.

On a test-flight on 16 August 1921, an Air Yacht piloted by David McCulloch reached an altitude of 19,500 ft (5,900 m) carrying three passengers (Grover Loening, Leroy Grumman, and Ladislas d'Orcy) in what was believed to be a record at the time. On 7 November 1924, Victor E. Bertrandias set a world airspeed record for a seaplane over a 1000-km course, with a speed of 103 mph (164 km/h) in an Army S-1.

Variants
S-1
Nine delivered to the United States Army
Model 23
Three delivered to New York-Newport Air Service and flown until 1923.
Type 23
One custom Type 23 was ordered by Vincent Astor, and a second  Curtiss powered variant was also ordered.
Custom 300 hp
Wright Aeronautical ordered a  Wright powered variant for a corporate aircraft named "Wilbur Wright".

Operators

New York-Newport Air Service
United States Army Air Service (Nine with the military designation S-1)

Specifications (S-1)

See also

References
Notes

Bibliography
 
 
 
 
 
 Johnson, E.R. American Flying Boats and Amphibious Aircraft: An Illustrated History. Jefferson, North Carolina: McFarland, 2009. .
 Nicolaou, Stéphane. Flying Boats & Seaplanes: A History from 1905. St. Paul, Minnesota: MBI, 1998. .
 Stoff, Joshua. Long Island Aircraft Manufacturers (Images of Aviation). Mount Pleasant, South Carolina: Arcadia Publishing, 2010. .

External links

S-1 in flight

1920s United States airliners
Flying boats
23
High-wing aircraft
Single-engined pusher aircraft
Aircraft first flown in 1921